John Humby Bennett (20 November 1922 – 2 August 2009) was an  Australian rules footballer who played with North Melbourne in the Victorian Football League (VFL).

Personal life
Bennett served as a gunner in the Australian Army during the Second World War.

Notes

External links 

1922 births
2009 deaths
North Melbourne Football Club players
West Melbourne Football Club players
Australian Army personnel of World War II
Australian Army soldiers
Australian rules footballers from Melbourne